

Tournament play begins
Though U.S. colleges had been fielding men's ice hockey teams since 1895, the NCAA did not have a formal tournament in place to decide a champion until after World War II. Starting with the 1947-48 season, the NCAA tournament invited the four top-ranked teams to Colorado Springs, Colorado to compete for the NCAA Championship.

Rotating tournaments
After spending 10 years at one location, the NCAA began to move the Division I ice hockey tournament to different sites. Over the next 14 years, the tournament was held in 11 different venues and, more importantly to the northeast teams, was held in New England eight times. While the rotations stopped briefly in 1972, they resumed after 1974 and the tournament has not been held in the same city for consecutive years since.

Quarterfinals expansion
For the 30th season of the tournament, which had become the de facto possession of the WCHA and ECAC, the NCAA instituted a new rule by which they were able to add up to four additional teams to the tournament if they saw fit. This policy essentially became a vehicle allowing the CCHA champion to play with the lone exception coming in 1978. For the 1981 tournament the NCAA altered the rule to guarantee a full quarterfinal round and started including true 'at large' teams for the first time. Between 1981 and 1987 the quarterfinals consisted of two games where the team that scored the most goals in the two games would advance to the "Frozen Four". Between 1977 and 1987 Detroit, Michigan and Providence, Rhode Island would each host the tournament 4 separate times.

Additional expansion
With 4 major conferences and a myriad of independent programs competing at the Division I level, the tournament was expanded to 12 teams beginning with the 1987-88 season. The first round followed the same pattern as the quarterfinals with teams playing two games against a single opponent and the one with a higher goal total after the series advancing. The rest of the tournament retained the earlier format. One year later the goal-total format was abandoned and replaced by a best-of-three series for the opening round and quarterfinals. In 1992 the entire tournament was switched to a single-elimination format and divided into two regional locations that would feed into the "Frozen Four". For the first time, in 1999, the championship was held in a region without a local Division I program when the championship round was awarded to Anaheim, California.

Further expansion and commercialization
After the addition of two more conferences around the turn of the century (MAAC and CHA, neither of which now sponsors men's hockey) bringing up the total number to 6, and with each receiving an at-large bid starting in 2001 and 2003 respectively, the tournament was again expanded by 4 teams. Two additional regional groups were added (Northeast and Midwest) and byes into the quarterfinals were eliminated. Additionally the "Frozen Four" was seen as a vehicle to increase both revenue and the popularity of college hockey, as such the apex of the tournament began to move around to non-traditional college hockey areas, usually in the buildings of NHL teams.

The first decade of the 21st century saw significant changes to hockey's conference landscape. After the 2002–03 season, the MAAC hockey programs split from the league to form Atlantic Hockey. CHA stopped sponsoring men's hockey after the 2009–10 season, but still operates as a women's league.

Conference realignment and dissolution
In 2010, Terry Pegula, an alumnus of Pennsylvania State University, donated $102 million to his alma mater for the express purpose of building a brand-new hockey arena and to fund the upgrade of both the men's and women's ice hockey programs from club level to Division I. This began a chain of events that caused a massive amount of conference realignment, the founding of two new conferences, and the ending of one of the oldest conferences in the NCAA. Penn State's rise to the D-I ranks gave the Big Ten its sixth university that sponsored varsity men's ice hockey, a number significant for two reasons. First, Big Ten bylaws dictate that the conference can only sponsor a sport if it has at least six participating members. More significantly, NCAA rules on conference formation dictate that at least six teams must be present for a conference to receive an automatic bid into the NCAA tournament. In short order the other five teams announced their intention to leave their conferences (WCHA and CCHA). In response several members of the WCHA, including traditional powerhouses Denver and North Dakota, split to form a new conference, the NCHC. The NCHC quickly grew to 8 member teams, leaving the WCHA with only 4 remaining schools and the CCHA with 6. Five of the remaining CCHA schools then proceeded to join the WCHA, along with the Independent Alabama-Huntsville, bringing the WCHA up to 10 member schools. The remaining CCHA team, Notre Dame, joined Hockey East. In essence all of the universities that changed conferences were not significantly harmed by the upheaval because no team was left without a conference by the start of the 2013–14 season. However, the shift did create one more automatic qualifier for the tournament, reducing the chance to receive an at-large bid for all schools across the nation.

In November 2019, the seven Midwestern schools among the 10 members of the men's WCHA jointly announced they would leave the league after the 2020–21 season, citing the league's extended geographic footprint as a reason for this move. On February 18, 2020, these seven schools announced they would start play in a new CCHA in the 2021–22 season. In July of that year, the revived CCHA announced that St. Thomas, which had just received NCAA approval to move directly from Division III to Division I starting in July 2021, would join the league upon its arrival in D-I.

The 2020 tournament was cancelled on March 12, 2020, just before the start of most conference postseason tournaments, due to concerns from the COVID-19 pandemic.

Conference timeline

Chronological Statistical Leaders
Since 1947-48, as of 2022

Single Season Points

Career Points

Single Season Goals

Career Goals

Single Season Wins†

† Most individual goaltending statistics were not recorded before 1960

Career Wins‡

‡ prior to 1970 NCAA rules limited players to 3 varsity seasons

Single Season Goals Against Average*

* At least 1/3 of team's minutes played

Career Goals Against Average^

^ Minimum 30 games played

See also
List of NCAA Division I men's ice hockey champions

References

External links
USCHO.com
College Hockey Historical Archives

 
Seasons, men